was a Japanese historian. He specialized in Song Dynasty history.

Education and career
He graduated from Tokyo University of Education, and later served as a professor at Nihon University until 2007 .

External links
 http://www.chs.nihon-u.ac.jp/hist_dpt/tansensei.html

20th-century Japanese historians
Historians of China
Academic staff of Nihon University
1937 births
2011 deaths
21st-century Japanese historians